System 8 may refer to:

Computing 
 Copland, an unreleased operating system
 Mac OS 8, a late 1990s version of the Macintosh operating system
 Digital Equipment Corporation PDP-8 operating systems:
 OS/8, released in 1971
 TSS/8, released in 1968
 MS/8, released in 1966
 PDP-8 4K Disk Monitor System, released in 1965
 Exec 8, the Unisys operating system
 WPS-8 (Word Processing System-8) - Digital Equipment Corporation word processor

Other uses 
 STS-8 (Space Transportation System-8), the Space Shuttle mission
 Base-8 number system
 Roland System-8, the Roland Corporation synthesizer

See also
 OS8 (disambiguation)